Rodrigo Toscano  (born 1964 in San Diego) is an American poet.

Life
Originally from San Diego, California, Toscano lived in San Francisco from 1995 to 1999, and in Brooklyn, New York from 1999 to 2015.  He works for the Labor Institute based in New York City, and lives in New Orleans, Louisiana.

Awards
 2019 Edwin Markham prize for poetry
 2007 National Poetry Series
2005 New York State Fellowship in Poetry
 2005 Fund for Poetry
1998 Fund for Poetry

Works

Poetry

Dialogues & Interviews
https://rodrigotoscano.com/interviews-dialogues/

Anthologies

References

External links
 Rodrigo Toscano, website
"Rodrigo Toscano", Electronic Poetry Center
"Jacket Interview: Rodrigo Toscano", Jacket 28, October 2005
Poems by Rodrigo Toscano in InDigest Magazine

1964 births
Living people
American male poets
21st-century American poets
21st-century American male writers